Veerapatty	 is a village in the Annavasalrevenue block of Pudukkottai district, Tamil Nadu, India.

Demographics 

As per the 2001 census, Veerapatty had a total population of 5982 with 2851 males and 3131 females. Out of the total population 3799    people were literate.

References

Villages in Pudukkottai district